Rémi Schelcher (8 August 1905 – 20 April 1988) was a French sailor. He competed in the 8 Metre event at the 1936 Summer Olympics.

References

External links
 

1905 births
1988 deaths
French male sailors (sport)
Olympic sailors of France
Sailors at the 1936 Summer Olympics – 8 Metre
Sportspeople from Paris